Princess Faiza (8 November 1923 – 6 June 1994) was an Egyptian princess and a member of the Muhammad Ali Dynasty.

Early life
Princess Faiza was born in the Abdeen Palace, Cairo, on 8 November 1923. She was the third child of King Fuad I and Nazli Sabri. Princess Faiza was the sister of King Farouk, Princess Fawzia, Princess Faika and Princess Fathia. Her maternal great-grandfather was Major-General Muhammad Sharif Pasha, prime minister and minister for foreign affairs, who was of Turkish origin.

Marriage and activities
Princess Faiza did not want to marry a member of the Middle East royal family. Instead, she married her Turkish cousin Bulent Rauf, who was thirty-four years old, in Cairo on 17 May 1945. Their marriage was arranged through familial relations. He was a Western educated man and the grandson of Ismail Pasha. King Farouk did not support their marriage, but reluctantly endorsed it. Princess Faiza and her husband lived in the Zohria Palace on Gezira Island on the Nile after their marriage. 

Princess Faiza was instrumental in Princess Fawzia’s long period of convalescence in Egypt after divorcing from the Shah of Iran in 1948. Faiza was one of the leading figures of the Red Crescent Society in Egypt during the reign of King Farouk. King Farouk put her and her husband under house arrest due to his suspicion. She and her husband launched a homemade film about a military coup six weeks before the events of 1952. They had no issue, and divorced in 1962.

Later life and death
After the abdication of King Farouk following the 1952 Revolution in Egypt, Princess Faiza moved to Istanbul in 1954. Then, she and her husband went to Spain and France. Next, she went to the US and settled in Beverly Hills, leaving her husband in Paris.

Princess Faiza died on 9 June 1994 at the age of 70 in Westwood, Los Angeles.

Honours
  Decoration of Al Kemal in brilliants.

Ancestry

References

External links

20th-century Egyptian women
1923 births
1994 deaths
Daughters of kings
Egyptian Muslims
Egyptian people of Albanian descent
Egyptian people of Circassian descent
Egyptian people of Turkish descent
Egyptian princesses
Egyptian expatriates in France
Egyptian expatriates in Germany
Egyptian expatriates in Turkey
Egyptian expatriates in the United States
Muhammad Ali dynasty